This article is about the particular significance of the year 1991 to Wales and its people.

Incumbents

Secretary of State for Wales – David Hunt
Archbishop of Wales
George Noakes, Bishop of St David's (retired)
Alwyn Rice Jones, Bishop of St Asaph
Archdruid of the National Eisteddfod of Wales – Ap Llysor

Events
6 January - A Maltese tanker, the Kimya, capsizes off the Anglesey coast.  Ten crew members are drowned, and the ship's cargo of sunflower oil causes marine pollution.
January - Two Welsh soldiers are among those killed in the first Gulf War.
4 April - Peter Hain is elected as MP for Neath in a by-election caused by the death of the sitting MP, Donald Coleman.
16 May - Huw Edwards is elected as MP for Monmouth in a by-election caused by the death of the sitting MP, Sir John Stradling Thomas.
23 May - A memorial to Gwenllian ferch Gruffydd is dedicated at Kidwelly Castle.
19 July - Dean Saunders, 27-year-old Welsh international striker, becomes the most expensive player to be signed by a British club when a £2.9million fee takes him from Derby County to Liverpool, who have broken the record fee in British football for the third time in four years.
31 August–3 September - Cardiff Ely Bread Riots: A dispute between two shopkeepers escalates into four consecutive nights of rioting in the Ely district of Cardiff.
16 October - Manchester United winger Ryan Giggs, who turns 18 at the end of the following month, becomes the youngest full international for the Welsh national team against Germany in Nuremberg.
21 October - Welshman Eric Jones is one of a team of four who make the first hot-air balloon flight over Mount Everest.
25 October - Official opening of Conwy Crossing (immersed tube tunnel) to road traffic as part of A55 Conwy Bypass.
8 November - Penallta Colliery closes.
date unknown - The Welsh Office proposes an M4 relief road between Magor and Castleton.

Arts and literature
August - Simultaneous translation facilities are made available for the first time at the National Eisteddfod of Wales.
1 September - Cantorion Colin Jones is founded in Wrexham.
The first Pacific Northwest Welsh Weekend is held at Seattle.
Wyn Calvin becomes the first Welshman to be elected King Rat of the Order of Water Rats.

Awards
National Eisteddfod of Wales (held in Mold, with record attendance of 164,100)
National Eisteddfod of Wales: Chair - Robin Llwyd ab Owain, "Merch Ein Amserau" (The Girl of Our Times)
National Eisteddfod of Wales: Crown - Einir Jones, "Pelydrau"
National Eisteddfod of Wales: Prose Medal - Angharad Tomos, Si Hei Lwli
Gwobr Goffa Daniel Owen - withheld

New books

English language
A Cardiff Anthology
Phil Rickman - Candlenight

Welsh language
Robat Arwyn & Robin Llwyd ab Owain - Gwin Beaujolais
Pennar Davies - Gwas y Gwaredwr
Glyn Tegai Hughes - Daniel Owen a Natur y Nofel
Saunders Lewis - Williams Pantycelyn (new ed.)
Prys Morgan - Brad y Llyfrau Gleision

Music
Datblygu - Blwch Tymer Tymor
Y Cyrff - Llawenydd Heb Ddiwedd (album)
Bonnie Tyler - Bitterblue (album)

Film

Welsh-language films
Elenya
Un Nos Ola Leuad

Broadcasting

English-language television
Joshua Jones (children's programme made by S4C)
Catherine Zeta-Jones makes her first appearance in The Darling Buds of May.

Welsh-language television
Gemau Heb Ffiniau

Sport
BBC Wales Sports Personality of the Year – Ian Woosnam
Football
5 June - Wales defeat Germany in the UEFA Euro 1992 qualifying tournament.
Golf - Ian Woosnam wins the US Masters at Augusta, Georgia, becoming the first Welshman to win a major tournament.
Rugby union - Neil Jenkins plays his first rugby match for Wales, at the age of 19.

Births
21 January - Craig Roberts, actor
28 January - Ffion Bowen, rugby union winger
3 February - Adrian Quaife-Hobbs, racing driver
4 February - Fred Evans, boxer
28 March - David Cornell, footballer
12 April - Ashley Jazz Richards, footballer
24 May - Aled Davies, paralympian field athlete (throwing events)
5 July - Michael White, snooker player
10 August - Amy Dowden, dancer
23 August - Laura O'Sullivan, footballer (goalkeeper)
3 October - Jenny McLoughlin, athlete
20 October - Nathaniel Jarvis, footballer
29 November - Becky James, track racing cyclist

Deaths
14 January - Donald Coleman, politician, 65
30 January - Rhys Lloyd, Baron Lloyd of Kilgerran, politician, 83
10 February - Rowe Harding, rugby player, 89
19 February - Tom Rees, Wales international rugby player, 77
18 March - Robert Roland Hughes, neurologist, 79/80
24 March - Maudie Edwards, actress and singer, 84
29 March - John Stradling Thomas, politician, 65
July - Evan Roberts, conservationist
12 August - Edward George Bowen, CBE, physicist, 80
23 August - Innes Lloyd, TV producer, 66
26 August - John Petts, artist, 77
31 August - Idwal Rees, Wales rugby union captain, 81
October - Seymour Morris, footballer, 78
13 October - Donald Houston, actor, 67
5 November - Gwenlyn Parry, dramatist, 59
15 December - Ray Smith, actor, 55
22 December - Jim Lang, Wales rugby union player, 82

References

See also
1991 in Northern Ireland

Wales